INS Magdala an Indian Naval minesweeper, took its name from the minor port of Magdala, located  inshore of river Tapti at the Gulf of Khambat (Cambay). She was an inshore minesweeper (IMS) specially designed and built with glass reinforced plastic hull.

The ship was capable of operating in approaches to harbour and inshore waters in order to search, locate and destroy various types of mines.

Service

As the naval band played Last Post, the national flag and national ensign fluttering on INS Magdala were lowered for the last time. That marked the decommissioning of INS Magdala, the sixth ship under project 1258 E.

INS Magdala, built at Leningrad in the erstwhile USSR, was commissioned on 10 May 1984 by Vice Admiral KK Nayyar, the then Flag Officer Commanding-in-Chief, Southern Naval Command. The ship was a part of the 20th Mine Counter Measure Squadron (MCMS) and was placed under the Naval Officer-in-Charge (Kerala & Lakshadweep) at Kochi.

During her commission, she undertook various operational commitments such as mine counter- measure exercises, tracking exercises, visits to various minor ports and search and rescue missions. The ship also paid a goodwill visit to Male in October 1989.

References

Mahé-class minesweepers